Mimorsidis sarawakensis is a species of beetle in the family Cerambycidae. Masao Hayashi described it in 1976. It is known from Borneo and Malaysia.

References

Lamiini
Beetles described in 1976